The 2009 Korean FA Cup, known as the  2009 Hana Bank FA Cup, was the 14th edition of the Korean FA Cup. It began on 1 March 2009, and ended on 8 November 2009. Suwon Samsung Bluewings won their second title, and qualified for the 2010 AFC Champions League.

Qualifying rounds

First round

Second round

Third round

Final rounds

Bracket

Round of 32

Round of 16

Quarter-finals

Semi-finals

Final

Awards

Main awards
Source:

Man of the Round

See also
2009 in South Korean football
2009 K League
2009 Korea National League
2009 K3 League
2009 U-League
2009 Korean League Cup

References

External links
Official website
Fixtures & Results at KFA

2009
2009 in South Korean football
2009 domestic association football cups